Stefano Di Cola (born 11 December 1998) is an Italian swimmer. He competed at the 2020 Summer Olympics.

Di Cola is an athlete of the Gruppo Sportivo della Marina Militare.

Biography
He competed in the 4×200 m freestyle relay event at the 2018 European Aquatics Championships, winning the bronze medal.

References

1998 births
Living people
Italian male swimmers
Italian male freestyle swimmers
European Aquatics Championships medalists in swimming
Mediterranean Games gold medalists for Italy
Mediterranean Games medalists in swimming
Swimmers at the 2018 Mediterranean Games
Swimmers of Marina Militare
Swimmers at the 2020 Summer Olympics
Olympic swimmers of Italy
Universiade medalists in swimming
21st-century Italian people
People from San Benedetto del Tronto
Sportspeople from the Province of Ascoli Piceno
Universiade silver medalists for Italy
Universiade bronze medalists for Italy
Medalists at the 2019 Summer Universiade